Bassett is an English surname. Notable people with the surname include:

Academia 

 John Spencer Bassett (1867–1928), American professor at Trinity College (Duke University)
 Joshua Bassett (c.1641–1720), English academic at Cambridge
 Mary Bassett, commissioner of the New York City Department of Health and Mental Hygiene
Paddy Bassett (born 1918), retired agricultural scientist from New Zealand

Arts and entertainment 

 Angela Bassett (born 1958), American actress
 Dave Bassett (songwriter), American songwriter and producer
 Desireé Bassett (born 1992), American musician
 James Bassett (author) (1912–1978), American newspaper editor and author
 Johnnie Bassett (1935–2012), American electric blues guitarist, singer, and songwriter
 Johnny Bassett (born 1935), English progenitor of Beyond the Fringe
 Joshua Bassett (born 2000), American actor and singer
 Leslie Bassett (born 1923), American composer of classical music
 Nick Bassett, American musician
 Ronald Bassett (1924–1996), British novelist

Military 

 Cyril Bassett (1892–1983), New Zealand recipient of the Victoria Cross
 Edgar R. Bassett (1914–1942), United States Navy officer, pilot, and Navy Cross recipient

Politics and governance 
 Burwell Bassett Jr., (March 18, 1764 – February 26, 1841)  American politician and Virginia plantation owner
 Ebenezer Bassett (1833–1908), American diplomat
 Edward Bassett (1863–1948), "Father of American Zoning"
 Isabel Bassett (born 1939), Canadian broadcaster and politician
 Mabel Bassett (1876-1953), Oklahoman Commissioner of Charities and Corrections
 Michael Bassett (born 1938), former member of the New Zealand House of Representatives
 Ralph Basset (died c. 1127), royal justice and administrator
 Richard Bassett (politician) (1745–1815), American lawyer and politician
 Richard Basset (died c. 1140), royal judge and administrator
 Wayne R. Bassett Sr. (1915-1988), American politician and librarian

Religion 

 Christopher Bassett (1753–1784), Welsh Methodist cleric
 Richard Bassett (clergyman) (1777–1852), Welsh clergyman

Sport 

 Arthur Bassett (rugby player), Welsh rugby union and rugby league footballer
 Billy Bassett (1869–1937), English football player and director
 Billy Bassett (Welsh footballer) (1912–1977), Welsh footballer
 Caitlin Bassett (born 1988), Australian netball player
 Carling Bassett-Seguso (born 1967), Canadian tennis player
 Charley Bassett (1863–1942), baseball player
 Dave Bassett (born 1944), English football manager
 Deborah Bassett (born 1965), Australian rower
 Glenn Bassett, American tennis player and coach
 Hubert Bassett (1867–1943), English cricketer
 Jack Bassett (born 1905), Welsh rugby full back
 John F. Bassett (1939–1986), Canadian tennis player and businessman
 Josh Bassett (born 1992), English rugby union player
 Laura Bassett (born 1983), English footballer
 Mo Bassett (1931–1991), American football player
 Nathan Bassett (born 1976), Australian rules footballer
 Ollie Bassett (born 1998), Northern Irish association footballer
 Ronnie Bassett Jr. (born 1995), American stock car racing driver
 Spencer Bassett (1885–1917), English footballer
 Zered Bassett (born 1984), American skateboarder

Other 
 Alexander Hunter Bassett (1795–1880) was a War of 1812 veteran and a noted planter and local leader in Henry County, Virginia.
 Ann Bassett (1878–1956), American rancher 
 Anne Bassett (born 1521 death unknown), mistress of Henry VIII of England
 Charles Bassett (1931–1966), American astronaut
 Charlie Bassett (circa 1847–1896), American lawman and saloon keeper
 Douglas Bassett (media executive) (born 1940), Canadian media executive
 George Bassett (1818–1886), British confectioner and mayor of Sheffield
 John Bassett (1915–1998), Canadian publisher
 Marnie Bassett (1889–1980), Australian historian and biographer
 Preston Bassett (1892–1992), American engineer
Samuel Symons Bassett (1840–1912), Australian winemaker and founder of Romavilla Winery
 William Bassett (d. 1667) Plymouth Colony

Fictional 

 Earl Bassett, a hired hand in the film Tremors
 Madeline Bassett, a P. G. Wodehouse character
 Mike Bassett: England Manager, 2001 satirical movie
 Watkyn Bassett, a P. G. Wodehouse character

See also
Basset (surname)
Bassitt, a surname

English-language surnames